Bezmiechowa Górna  ( or , Bezmihova Horishnia or Biz’mihova Horishnia) is a village in the administrative district of Gmina Lesko, within Lesko County, Subcarpathian Voivodeship, in south-eastern Poland.

References

External links 
 3D Digital Surface Model around Glider Training Center https://web.archive.org/web/20110720153303/http://www.aerialrobotics.eu/pub/bezmiechowa-2010-05-29/

Villages in Lesko County